The 8th Gujarat Legislative Assembly election was held in 1990. No party won the majority. Janata Dal (JD) and Bharatiya Janata Party (BJP) won 70 and 67 seats respectively. Indian National Congress won only 33 seats, compared to 149 seats in previous legislative election. The alliance of BJP and JD formed the government under the chief ministership of Chimanbhai Patel of JD and deputy chief ministership of Keshubhai Patel of BJP.

Results

Elected members

References

1990s in Gujarat
Gujarat
State Assembly elections in Gujarat